, or commonly known as Shibuya Crossing, is a popular scramble crossing in Shibuya, Tokyo, Japan. It is located in front of the Shibuya Station Hachikō exit and stops vehicles in all directions to allow pedestrians to inundate the entire intersection. The statue of Hachikō, between the station and the intersection is a common meeting place and almost always crowded.

Three large TV screens mounted on nearby buildings overlook the crossing, as well as many advertising signs. The Starbucks store overlooking the crossing is also one of the busiest in the world. Its heavy traffic and inundation of advertising have led to it being compared to the Times Square intersection in New York City and Piccadilly Circus intersection in London. Shibuya Crossing is the world’s busiest pedestrian crossing, with as many as 3,000 people crossing at a time. Tokyo-based architecture professor Shane Flynn has said Shibuya Crossing is "a great example of what Tokyo does best when it's not trying."

Cultural depictions and media usage

Shibuya Crossing is often featured in movies and television shows which take place in Tokyo, such as Lost in Translation, The Fast and the Furious: Tokyo Drift, Alice in Borderland, and Resident Evil: Afterlife, as well as on domestic and international news broadcasts. The iconic video screen featured in the above movies, in particular Lost in Translation with its 'walking dinosaur' scene, was taken down for a period of time and replaced with static advertising, although it resumed operation in July 2013.

Contemporary British painter Carl Randall (who spent 10 years living in Tokyo as an artist) depicted the area in his large artwork 'Shibuya', exhibited at the National Portrait Gallery in London 2013.

Foot traffic

This intersection is frequently called "the busiest pedestrian intersection in the world" and there is almost no loss of foot traffic at midnight or early morning. Road traffic jams rarely occur here even during rush hours.

According to the Shibuya Center Street in 2016, the number of pedestrians crossing the intersection was as much as 3,000 per green light (every 2 minutes). A 2014 flow measurement survey by the Shibuya Redevelopment Association estimated 260,000 pedestrians per day on week days, and 390,000 pedestrians on non-working days. Others estimate as much as 500,000 people on the busiest days. The 2012 SOTO Outdoor Media Survey estimated 1.5 million pedestrians per week.

History
The crossing was inaugurated in 1973.

The crossing was featured in the 2016 Summer Olympics closing ceremony to promote the 2020 Summer Olympics in Tokyo.

Since the late 2010s it has become a popular place for young people to gather at Halloween, some in cosplay costumes. Increasingly large and chaotic crowds led in 2019 to Shibuya Ward adopting an ordinance banning alcohol consumption in the area during the end of October.

References

Shibuya
Tourist attractions in Tokyo